The Alfa Romeo Dardo is a concept car designed by Pininfarina, whose source of inspiration was the Alfa Romeo 156 and a homage to decades of Pininfarina/Alfa Romeo cooperation in spiders design. The Dardo (Italian for dart) was introduced in the 1998, it is equipped with 2.5 litre V6, also from 156. With wheelbase slightly shorter than that of the 156. The styling for the Dardo's flanks uses a closing triangular shapes, as does the rear. The car incorporates the 156's dashboard with leather upholstery used for it and the seats. Pininfarina worked with Sparco to design and build the seats, which are supposed to have extremely rigid shell using carbon-Kevlar-carbon. It's also equipped with four-point seat belts. Its twin headlights were developed jointly with Valeo.

Technical specifications
Engine: 2.5 L V6
Platform: 156 sourced

References 

Dardo
Pininfarina